Alberta Investment Management Corporation (AIMCo) is an Albertan Crown corporation and institutional investor established to manage several public funds and pensions headquartered in Edmonton, Alberta. AIMCo was established by an act of the Legislative Assembly of Alberta in 2008 under the government of Progressive Conservative Premier Ed Stelmach.

AIMCo manages one of Canada's largest public pools of funds with assets under management totaling $168.3 billion as of year-end 2021. AIMCo manages the assets on behalf of 375,000 members of provincial public retirement programs, endowments, government funds, and other public accounts, including the $20.4 billion Alberta Heritage Savings Trust Fund.

Overview

The Progressive Conservative government first announced their intent to consolidate investment management under a new crown corporation on March 20, 2007, with the introduction of Alberta Investment Management Corporation Act (Bill 22). Originally founded under the name Alberta Investment Management Corporation, AIMCo would take over investment responsibilities from the provincial department of finance totaling $70 billion worth of assets. The provincial government claimed the change would lead to increase in annual return on investments of up to $500 million. The decision followed similar realignments by other governments in Canada, such as the formation of the Canada Pension Plan Investment Board. AIMCo was to be based in Edmonton and manage the Alberta Heritage Savings Trust Fund, Alberta Heritage Foundation for Medical Research, Local Authorities Pension Plan and other government pensions and funds and would be the fifth-largest investment fund in Canada at that time. The legislation creating AIMCo came into force on January 1, 2008. Leo de Bever, the former chief investment officer of Victorian Funds Management Corporation, was hired as AIMCo's chief executive officer in April 2008.

AIMCo made a number of large and high-profile investments in its first year of operations, purchasing stakes in pipelines in Spain, waterworks in England, and Puget Sound Energy in Washington. Early domestic investments included KMC Mining Corp, CCS Energy Services and a $280-million purchase of a 15 per cent stake in Precision Drilling on April 20, 2009.

In 2015 AIMCo earned a 9.1% total fund net return on behalf of its clients. By 2015 AIMCo was managing four endowment funds, seven pension plans, nine government funds, eight specialty funds, and other balanced funds.

In February 2017, AIMCo purchased HSBC Place, an 18-storey  office building in downtown Edmonton to serve as the headquarters for the firm. AIMCo began redeveloping the building in July 2018 to convert the space into a "AA" class office, including replacing the curtain wall exterior with triple glazed glass panes, new mechanical and electrical systems, and meeting LEED Gold, WELL Gold and WIRED Gold certification standards. The conversion was overseen by Edmonton architectural firm DIALOG.

Pensions plans whose assets are managed by AIMCo include the $50-billion  on behalf of Local Authorities Pension Plan (LAPP)'s 275,000 members which includes "Alberta's hospital workers and other current and retired government employees," Special Forces Pension Plan, Employment Pension Plans Act (EPPA), Public Service Pension Plan (PSPP), Management Employees Pension Plan (MEPP), Provincial Judges and Masters in Chambers Pension Plan (Registered) and Supplementary Retirement Plan for Provincial Judges and Masters in Chambers (Unregistered), and the Supplementary Retirement Plan for Public Service Managers. Following the addition of the Alberta Teachers' Retirement Fund (ATRF) assets under AIMCo's management through the November 2019 UCP budget Bill 22, the Reform of Agencies, Boards and Commissions and Government Enterprises Act—if passed—AIMCo would become the "investment manager of all public sector pensions". The change was made as part of the UCP's 2019 budget presented by Finance Minister, Travis Toews. The sole shareholder of these plans is the Alberta Minister of Finance.

By April 2020, AIMCo was managing about "$119-billion on behalf of 375,000 members of provincial public retirement programs as well as public accounts such as the province's $18-billion Heritage Savings Trust Fund."  AIMCo invests $50 billion on behalf of LAPP's 275,000 members, who include Alberta's hospital workers and other current and retired government employees.

Minister Toews said that AIMCo had "provided an annual return of 9.9 per cent on Albertans' investments" in the decade ending in 2019.

Assets under management
In the 2008/09 fiscal year ending March 31, 2009, AIMCo had $69.0 billion in assets under management (AUM). At that time, it was investing globally on behalf of 27 Alberta-based clients, ranging in size from the $100,000 Mildred Rowe Weston Estate to the $13.98 billion Alberta Heritage Savings Trust Fund. The 27 clients also represented funds with vastly different needs, such as the pension fund clients and endowment fund clients who desired long term growth to meet their current and far future needs, including the 290,000 active and retired public sector employees covered by AIMCo's eight pension fund clients at that time. These balanced fund clients, who rely on AIMCo to invest in a mix of money market and fixed income, equity, and illiquid (real estate, other hard assets), differ from the government fund and specialty fund clients who rely on AIMCo to invest their funds predominantly in risk-averse money market and fixed income investments, as they have "larger amounts of operating capital" that they will be needing to draw on over a very short timeline.

By the end of the 2021 calendar year, AIMCo had $168.3 billion in AUM. At that time, it was investing globally on behalf 31 Alberta-based clients, ranging in size from the $1 million A.L. Sifton Estate to the $61.6 billion Local Authorities Pension Plan. Since the 2008/09 report, the number of active and retired public sector employees covered by pension fund clients of AIMCo had grown from 290,000 people to over 375,000, not including the 85,000 active and retired teachers of the Alberta Teachers' Retirement Fund, which became an AIMCo client in 2021.

Governance and board of directors
In June 2020, Mark Wiseman was named the new chair of AIMCo.

In 2018 board members included J. Richard Bird as chair, Phyllis Clark, Helen Kearns, Ken Kroner, Jim Prieur, Tom Woods, Sharon Sallows, and Robert Vivian Jr. Talisman Energy's Jackie Sheppard was the newest member, replacing Harold Roozen, who served from 2011 until 2018 when he retired. IBM's Robert "Jay" Vivian Jr. had become a member in 2014 along with Suncor's John Ferguson, and Enbridge's J. Richard Bird. Bird, who retired from Enbridge in 2015, after having served in various executive positions there including as CFO and Executive Vice President, was designated as AIMCo CEO in June 2017—effective on October 21, 2017. Mac Van Wielingen had served as Board Chair from December 2014 until he stepped down in 2018. Kevin Uebelein was first named as AIMCo CEO to replace outgoing chairman Charles Baillie in 2014. The Lieutenant Governor of Alberta appoints all members of AIMCo's board.

AIMCo was established as a crown corporation by the Province of Alberta to provide independent, arms length investment management services to designated pension funds and provincial public sector bodies and funds, with strong accountability for its investment decisions. According to the Alberta Investment Management Corporation Regulation board members must have demonstrable expertise in areas such as "investment management, finance, accounting or law" or have held senior executive positions. According to AIMCo's 2010/2011 Annual report, the Board of Directors meets six times every year with meetings scheduled one year in advanc

AIMCo is headquartered in Edmonton, Alberta with additional offices in Toronto, Ontario, London, UK and Luxembourg.

Strategy
AIMCo is one of several "pooled investment portfolios" in Canada that allow for "client-controlled asset allocation for multiple public-sector pension plans and investment funds. Through pooled asset management, these entities achieve sufficient scale to produce significant cost savings through internal investment management and access to alternative asset classes." Through funds like these "Canada is emerging as a world-wide leader in successfully adapting the advantages of large funds to the public sector." These are "arm's-length investment management entities with sufficient scale, independent boards and internal investment management, remunerated at rates competitive with the private sector."

AIMCo's focuses its investments across three broad categories, Equities, Illiquid Investments, and Fixed Income all employing varying strategies.

Equity holdings, which contain both public and private equity, total to 43% (2015) of AUM. The public equity portfolio maintains exposure to a diversifying set of common style factors, as well as stock selection and other idiosyncratic risk. By investing with both private funds and co-venture deals, AIMCo private equity focuses on business that generate stable free cash flow and are operated by strong management teams.

Illiquid Investments, which constitute 22% of AUM, include long-term holdings in Real Estate, Infrastructure and Timberland. The long term Real Estate assets are the core strategy direct investments in office, retail, industrial and multi-unit residential properties located in major Canadian Centres. AIMCo's Infrastructure investments match long duration real return asset characteristics with inflation indexed-pension liabilities. The Infrastructure and Timberland assets are held to provide inflation hedging and a long-term duration match with client obligations.

The Fixed Income portfolios are managed with the objective of capital preservation, liquidity, and risk-controlled return relative to benchmark. These asset classes make up 35% of AIMCo's AUM.

Responsible Investing (RI)

In 2010, AIMCo became a signatory to the United Nations Principles for Responsible Investment, an international network of investors working together to implement its six aspirational principles for a more sustainable global financial system.

The 2018 Canadian Responsible Investment Trends Report, recognized the progress of major Canadian investors like the AIMCo, Canada Pension Plan Investment Board, Ontario Teachers' Pension Plan that are involved in responsible investing recognizing the value of long-term sustainability.

AIMCo's approach to socially responsible investing is governed by its fiduciary duty to clients and a long-term investment horizon while integrating environmental, social and corporate governance (ESG) factors into investment analysis. AIMCo's Responsible Investment processes include exercising proxy voting rights to promote long-term value and sustainability, engaging with companies identified by the AIMCo's Responsible Investment Committee to bring about positive social and environmental changes under a "voice over exit" principle, and being a signatory to the United Nations Principles for Responsible Investment, the Responsible Investment Association, the Canadian Coalition of Good Governance and several others. AIMCo publicly discloses its responsible investment policies, guiding documents, activities, and proxy voting record.

AIMCo was one of the 12 investment management firms who co-authored a paper to aid investors in climate-related corporate disclosure. The report was written as part of the Task Force on Climate-related Financial Disclosures, under the umbrella of the Investor Leadership Network.

Significant transactions 

In December 2010, in an AIMCo-led private equity investment, it acquired a 50 per cent interest in Chile's Autopista Central's 61-kilometer, six-lane toll highway in Santiago on behalf AIMCo clients. In 2011 AIMCo divested its stake in Autopista Central to Abertis for about 1.5 billion. In the same year, AIMCo, under a landmark transaction, acquired Morgan Stanley Infrastructure Partners 50% interest in the Chilean company from Inversiones Grupo Saesa Limitada (Grupo SAESA). This electricity transmission and distribution company is jointly owned by AIMCo and Ontario Teachers' Pension Plan (OTPP).

In 2012, Stanhope, Mitsui Fudosan UK and AIMCo, on behalf of its clients, completed the purchase of the BBC Television Centre in West London. Construction began in summer of 2015 to develop homes, offices, hotels, retail and leisure facilities within this 13.7-acre area.

In 2016, AIMCo's Infrastructure Private Equity group became the second largest shareholder of Howard Energy Partners, acquiring a 28% stake from EnLink Midstream Partners, LP. This transaction followed AIMCo's initial investment in August 2016 which allowed for the purchase of up to $500 million of Series B preferred units. Evercore Partners, a New York based investment bank served as financial advisor to AIMCo. AIMCo provided loans to companies such as the privately owned Calfrac Well Services, a large hydraulic fracturing company, which entered into a $200 million debt-with-warrants financing agreement. AIMCo also entered into a strategic financing agreement with D.E. Shaw & Co., a $40 billion New York-based hedge fund where it will provide $500 million in capital to pursue renewable energy investments globally. Also in 2016, an AIMCo led consortium of Ontario Municipal Employees Retirement System (OMERS), Ontario Teachers' Pension Plan (OTPP), and Wren House Infrastructure Management Limited (Wren House) acquired the London City Airport. This group, called the Consortium, committed to developing the existing and new airline relationship and routes, improving the airport's customer service and generating opportunities for new and existing employees.

In 2017, AIMCo, in partnership with MSD Capital and CCMP Capital acquired Hayward Industries in 2017. Although the consortium of investors acquired a majority stake in Hayward, management will retain a minority stake for investor alignment purposes. Bank of America and Houlihan Lokey served as financial advisors on this transaction while Morgan Stanley, Jefferies LLC, and Nomura Group provided financing for the deal.

AIMCo, in partnership with U.S. based AES Corp. acquired a 100% stake in FTP Power LLC from FirTree Partners for $1.6 billion in cash and debt. This investment gives AIMCo ownership of 150 utility and distributed electrical generation systems across the United States and the United Kingdom, increasing their exposure to green energy globally. Barclays Investment Bank and Citigroup served as co-financial advisors on this transaction. AIMCo, in combination with the Virginia Retirement System successfully recovered $204.5 million after co-leading the class action securities litigation against MF Global, a now defunct broker dealer. AIMCo was advised by Goldman Sachs under a consortium of underwriter defendants. AIMCo alongside long-term infrastructure investors Allianz Capital Partners (ACP) and Hastings Fund Management (Hastings) purchased Porterbrook Rail Finance Limited (Porterbook) for an undisclosed amount.  This major rolling stock leasing UK company owns and manages a fleet of approximately 5,900 railway vehicles. AIMCo is still a major stakeholder in this company.

In May 2019, AIMCo announced that it was acquiring an 85 per cent interest in the  $1.15 billion 90-kilometre Northern Courier pipeline system owned by the Calgary-based TC Energy's—formerly known as TransCanada Corporation. In a November 4 BNN Bloomberg interview with Amanda Lang, Uebelein said that the purchase was a fit for AIMCo. Northern Courier, which was completed in 2017 has an ongoing contract to ship the Fort Hills Reduced Carbon Life Cycle Dilbit Blend (FRB) to the terminal near Fort McMurray that is owned by Suncor Energy. FRB is produced through a Froth treatment method.

AIMCo lost much more than other "comparable funds" in February and March 2020, the initial weeks of the COVID-19 recession, by having investments "in contracts that pay off only if stock markets remain stable". AIMCo lost $4 billion when the "economic collapse wrought by COVID-19 sent the S&P 500 and other stock benchmarks on a roller coaster ride".

In July 2022, AIMCo and its real estate investment partner in the United Kingdom, Ridgeback Group, bought a portfolio of build-to-rent assets in Cardiff, Birmingham, Sheffield and London for £283m from Angelo Gordon; the investment doubled the overall AIMco / Ridgeback portfolio.

Organization

Employees
When AIMCo was created on January 1, 2008, it had a staff of 137. By December 31, 2016 the number of employees has grown to 425, across the organization's Investment Management and Risk teams, Investment Operations, and Corporate Services.

Operating costs

AIMCo operates on a cost-recovery basis. Total expenses for the year ended March 31, 2014 were $445 million, equating to 46 cents per $100 of invested assets. AIMCo is increasing internal investments in people and technology to achieve greater cost-efficiencies over the next three years. It expects to internalize the management of an additional $8 billion of assets ($5 billion in equities and $3 billion in inflation sensitive). The net result is a projected savings of $45 million in operating costs every year, starting in 2012. These cost savings may then be passed along to the Clients on whose behalf funds are managed.

Clients
AIMCo manages funds for a diverse group of Alberta public sector clients. It creates portfolios that reflect the clients' chosen risk and return profiles. The majority of AIMCo's assets under management come from Alberta public sector pension plans and provincial endowment funds. Collectively known as AIMCo's Balanced Funds, these clients are primarily invested in equities, bonds and inflation sensitive products. Other assets, managed for the Government of Alberta, are generally invested in money market and short-term bonds.

Alberta Heritage Savings Trust Fund

The Alberta Heritage Savings Trust Fund was created in 1976 by the Alberta Heritage Savings Trust Fund Act with three objectives: "to save for the future, to strengthen or diversify the economy, and to improve the quality of life of Albertans.

Initially, the fund received 30 per cent of Alberta's non-renewable resource royalties. During the early 1980s, the fund made loans to other provincial governments in Canada.  Later the fund's money was used for capital infrastructure projects.

To date, over $33 billion has been made available to fund Albertans' priorities, such as health care, education, infrastructure and social programs. The Fund is managed with the goal of maximizing long-term real returns at a prudent level of risk. Under the Alberta Heritage Savings Trust Fund Act, all income, less the amount required for inflation proofing, is used as revenue by the government. The Heritage Fund is a member of the International Forum of Sovereign Wealth Funds and is therefore signed up to the Santiago Principles on best practice in managing sovereign wealth funds. AIMCo works closely with Alberta Treasury Board and Finance to set long-term objectives for the Heritage Fund and implements these objectives through investments in a globally diversified mix of bonds, public and private equities, hedge funds, real estate and other real asset investments, such as infrastructure and timberland.

Pension Plans
Pensions plans whose assets are managed by AIMCo include the Alberta Teachers' Retirement Fund (ATRF), Local Authorities Pension Plan (LAPP), Public Service Pension Plan, Special Forces Pension Plan, Employment Pension Plans Act (EPPA), Public Service Pension Plan (PSPP), Management Employees Pension Plan (MEPP), Provincial Judges and Masters in Chambers Pension Plan (Registered) and Supplementary Retirement Plan for Provincial Judges and Masters in Chambers (Unregistered), and the Supplementary Retirement Plan for Public Service Managers. The sole shareholder of these plans is the Alberta Minister of Finance.

Local Authorities Pension Plan (LAPP) On March 1, 2019, LAPP's primary oversight role was transferred from Alberta's Minister of Finance to the newly established LAPP Corporation, which under Canadian law, made the LAPP corporation the fiduciary to LAPP members requiring the corporation to "act solely in the best interests of the members. LAPP formally became a "jointly-sponsored pension plan registered under the Employment Pension Plans Act (EPPA) of Alberta."
 Public Service Pension Plan (PSPP) – established in 1947, this plan is for employees of the Alberta government and other public service organizations.
 Special Forces Pension Plan (SFPP) – established in 1979 for police officers, police chiefs, and deputy chiefs employed by local authorities in Alberta.
 Management Employees Pension Plan (MEPP) – the foundations of this plan were established in 1972. Then known as the Public Service Management Pension Plan for management employees of the Alberta government and other public sector organizations. In 1994 the Plan changed and was renamed MEPP.
 Provincial Judges and Masters in Chambers Pension Plan (Registered) and Supplementary Retirement Plan for Provincial Judges and Masters in Chambers (Unregistered); collectively known as the "Judges Pension Plan" – the registered part of the Plan provides benefits up to the maximum allowed for registered pension plans under federal tax rules. The unregistered part of the Plan provides benefits in excess of those limits. Established in 2001 with provisions retroactive to April 1, 1998, the Judges Pension Plan replaced the Provincial Judges and Masters in Chambers Pension Plan established September 1, 1988. Prior to that, judges and masters in chambers contributed to the Public Service Management Pension Plan.
 Supplementary Retirement Plan for Public Service Managers – established on July 1, 1999, this plan provides additional pension benefits to public service managers of designated employers who participate in the Management Employees Pension Plan (MEPP) and whose annual salary exceeds the yearly maximum pensionable earnings limit under Canada's Income Tax Act.

Government Funds 
The Government funds managed by AIMCo are used for Albertan services such as health care, education, infrastructure and social programs. As a result, AIMCo invests in private equity, public equity, fixed income and private debt.

Controversies

Consolidation of pension assets
On June 11, 2020 the United Conservative government introduced the Reform of Agencies, Boards and Commissions and Government Enterprises Act, 2019 (Bill 22) amending a number of provincial statutes including transferring the administration of the Alberta Teachers' Retirement Fund to AIMCo, and requiring the two other largest public sector pension plans to use only AIMCo as investment managers.

In December 2020, the Universities Academics Pension Plan (UAPP) agreed to move its public equities portfolio from AIMCo to a new investment manager. The UAPP board cited the response by AIMCo to the recent losses attributed to the volatile investment strategy as the reason for the move.

2020 $2.1-billion loss
In April 2020, AIMCo reported a $2.1-billion loss following the 2020 stock market crash. The loss was attributed to a volatility-based investment strategy (VOLTS); the strategy was described as a "blunder" by the New York City based trade publication Institutional Investor. The loss represented approximately one-third of AIMCo's 2019 net investment income of $11.5-billion. Following the loss, the fund quickly changed their volatility strategies and CEO Kevin Uebelein announced he would leave AIMCo by June 2021. AIMCo's board of directors completed a review of the VOLTS Investment Strategy in June 2020, AIMCo adopted the ten recommendations of the review intended to prevent a reoccurrence of the severe losses, but did not prohibit the fund from engaging in volatility or other derivative-based investment strategies. Furthermore, the report indicated the risk culture in the organization was "unsatisfactory", and senior leaders were not provided enough information about the risks to investments in a timely manner.

See also
 Caisse de dépôt et placement du Québec
 CPP Investment Board
 Alberta Heritage Savings Trust Fund
 Ontario Teachers' Pension Plan
 OMERS

Notes

References

References

Works cited
 Main webpage with links to non-contiguous  pages in each year's report (including exact date of release), plus secondary links to the following contiguous pdfs for each report:

External links
 
 Heritage Fund

Financial services companies established in 2008
Crown corporations of Alberta
Companies based in Edmonton
Canadian companies established in 2008
Public pension funds in Canada
Investment management companies of Canada
Investment companies of Canada
2008 establishments in Alberta
Financial services companies based in Alberta